Swiss-German may refer to:
pertaining to Germany–Switzerland relations
variously, used ambiguously:
Germans in Switzerland, see German immigration to Switzerland
Swiss in Germany, see Swiss_abroad#Germany
the Swiss German language
German-speaking Swiss people, see German-speaking Switzerland

See also
 German Swiss (disambiguation)